Froggy may refer to:

Frog, especially a diminutive version
 An ethnic slur to describe the French

Nickname, pen name or stage name
Kermit Davis (born 1959), men's head basketball coach at Middle Tennessee State University
F. Gwynplaine MacIntyre (1948-2010), journalist, novelist, poet and illustrator
Alan Thomson (cricketer) (born 1945), Australian former cricketer
DJ Froggy, real name Steven Howlett, British DJ
Froggy Fresh, American rapper

Fictional characters
Froggy the Gremlin, on the Buster Brown Gang radio show and Andy's Gang TV show in the 1940s and 1950s
Froggy, an Our Gang film character played by Billy Laughlin
Froggy, in Russell Banks's novel Rule of the Bone
"Froggy" LeSueur, in The Foreigner (play)
Froggy (Sonic the Hedgehog character), a frog in the Sonic the Hedgehog series of video games
Froggy, a character from The Land of Stories (a Chris Colfer novel)
Froggy, the titular character of the Froggy book series written by Jonathan London

Other uses
Froggy (game), a Commodore 64 computer game
Froggy (brand), a brand of radio stations that play mostly country music
Froggy (ISP), an Australian internet service provider that went bankrupt in 2002

See also
Frogger (disambiguation)